Devante Malik Smith-Pelly (born June 14, 1992) is a Canadian former professional ice hockey winger. He was selected by the Anaheim Ducks in the second round, 42nd overall, of the 2010 NHL Entry Draft. Smith-Pelly played in the style of a power forward and was known for his hitting and forechecking abilities. Smith-Pelly won the Stanley Cup as a member of the Capitals in 2018.

Playing career

Junior
Smith-Pelly began his major junior career in 2008–09, recording 25 points over 57 games with the Mississauga St. Michael's Majors of the Ontario Hockey League (OHL). During the 2009 playoffs, he added five points over 11 games. One of his two goals ended the second-longest game in OHL history, as he scored in triple-overtime to eliminate the Barrie Colts in the conference quarterfinals. The following season, he improved to 62 points over 60 games. In the subsequent summer, he was selected 42nd overall by the Anaheim Ducks in the 2010 NHL Entry Draft.

Returning to the OHL for a third season following his draft, Smith-Pelly recorded a junior career-high 36 goals and 66 points over 67 games. He added 21 points in 20 OHL playoff games, as the Majors lost in the Finals to the Owen Sound Attack. Despite losing the OHL title, the Majors qualified for the 2011 Memorial Cup, Canada's national major junior tournament, by way of having been chosen as the host team at the beginning of the season. Advancing to the final, the Majors were defeated by the Saint John Sea Dogs In the Memorial Cup Final, 3–1. Smith-Pelly recorded six points over five games and was named to the Tournament All-Star Team.

Professional
Although eligible for one more OHL season in 2011–12, Smith-Pelly made the Anaheim Ducks' roster out of training camp. He recorded five points in his first 26 games before the Ducks agreed to loan him to the Canadian national junior team in December 2011.

During his first full season in the NHL with the Ducks in 2014–15, having produced 17 points in 54 games, on February 24, 2015, he was traded to the Montreal Canadiens in exchange for Jiří Sekáč.

In the following 2015–16 season, Smith-Pelly got off to a strong start with the Canadiens as they had a franchise-best 9 straight wins to start the year. However, with only 6 goals through 46 games, he was dealt by the Canadiens to the New Jersey Devils, just a little over a year from when he was acquired on February 29, 2016, in exchange for Stefan Matteau. During the offseason, on July 1, 2016, Smith-Pelly signed a two-year, $2.6 million contract extension with the Devils.

After Smith-Pelly regressed in the 2016–17 season, he was placed on waivers by the Devils in order to buy out the remaining year and $1.3 million left on his contract on June 30, 2017. On July 3, 2017, he was signed to a one-year, two-way contract with the Washington Capitals with a $650,000 salary.

On February 17, 2018, Smith-Pelly was the target of a racist chant by four fans at the United Center during a game against the Chicago Blackhawks. The four fans, who were chanting the word "basketball", were escorted out of the United Center and issued a lifetime ban from the arena by the Blackhawks organization. Both the NHL and Blackhawks condemned the action of the four fans and apologized to Smith-Pelly.

Smith-Pelly scored seven goals in the 2018 playoffs, including the tying goal in the clinching game five of the Stanley Cup, helping the Capitals secure their first NHL title in team history. Smith-Pelly became the second player in NHL history, behind Patrice Bergeron-Cleary to have a hyphenated surname engraved on the Stanley Cup.

During the 2018–19 season, Smith-Pelly continued with the Capitals in a fourth-line role. Through inconsistent play and contributing with 8 points in 54 games, on February 20, 2019, Smith-Pelly was placed on waivers by the Washington Capitals before successfully clearing on 21 February. He was then assigned to affiliate, the Hershey Bears, returning to the AHL for the first time since 2014.

Smith-Pelly returned to the Washington Capitals during the 2019 Stanley Cup first-round series after T. J. Oshie was injured in Game 4 versus the Carolina Hurricanes.

Leaving the Capitals as a free agent, Smith-Pelly, with limited NHL interest, opted to sign abroad for the first time in his career, agreeing to a one-year contract with Chinese-based club, HC Kunlun Red Star of the Kontinental Hockey League. In the 2019–20 season, Smith-Pelly in a checking-line role added 8 goals and 11 points through 36 regular season games.

In the pandemic delayed 2020–21 season, Smith-Pelly belatedly returned to the North American professional circuit after accepting a professional tryout contract with the Ontario Reign of the AHL, primary affiliate to the Los Angeles Kings on March 13, 2021. While playing with the Reign, Smith-Pelly played on a line with Quinton Byfield and Akil Thomas, forming the first all-Black line in the history of the team. On December 30, 2022, Smith-Pelly announced his retirement from professional hockey.

International play

Smith-Pelly debuted with Hockey Canada at the 2009 World U-17 Hockey Challenge. He recorded three assists over six games playing with Team Ontario, helping them to a gold medal win.

During his NHL rookie season, the Anaheim Ducks loaned Smith-Pelly to the Canadian junior team for the 2012 World Junior Championships. One of two players to be loaned from the NHL (Tampa Bay Lightning forward Brett Connolly was the other), he was named an alternate captain for the team. In Canada's first game of the tournament, against Finland, he broke a bone in his left foot blocking a shot. Opting to stay with the team rather than return to Anaheim to begin his rehabilitation, Smith-Pelly watched as Canada went on to win the bronze medal and since he was part of the Canadian roster, he also received a medal.

Career statistics

Regular season and playoffs

International

Awards and honours

References

External links

1992 births
Living people
Anaheim Ducks draft picks
Anaheim Ducks players
Black Canadian ice hockey players
Canadian expatriate ice hockey players in China
Canadian expatriate ice hockey players in the United States
Canadian ice hockey left wingers
HC Kunlun Red Star players
Hershey Bears players
Laval Rocket players
Mississauga St. Michael's Majors players
Montreal Canadiens players
New Jersey Devils players
Norfolk Admirals players
Ontario Reign (AHL) players
Sportspeople from Scarborough, Toronto
Ice hockey people from Toronto
Stanley Cup champions
Syracuse Crunch players
Washington Capitals players